The 2002 Southland Conference men's basketball tournament took place March 4–9, 2002. The quarterfinal and semifinal rounds were played at the home arena of the higher seeded-teams, with the championship game played at Burton Coliseum in Lake Charles, Louisiana.

Top-seeded  won the championship game over second-seeded , and earned the conference's automatic bid to the NCAA tournament. Fred Gentry of McNeese State was named the tournament's MVP.

Format
The top six eligible men's basketball teams in the Southland Conference received a berth in the conference tournament.  After the conference season, teams were seeded by conference record. For the semifinal round, the remaining teams were reseeded.

Bracket

References

Tournament
Southland Conference men's basketball tournament
Southland Conference men's basketball tournament
Southland Conference men's basketball tournament